The 1963–64 Volleyball Women's European Cup was the fourth edition of the official competition for European women's volleyball national champions. It was contested by ten teams, and ran from 14 December 1963 to 7 March 1964. Levski Sofia defeated defending champion Dynamo Moscow in the semifinals and Dynamo Berlin in the final to become the first non-Soviet team to win the competition.

Preliminary round

Quarterfinals

Semifinals

Final

References 

European Cup
European Cup
CEV Women's Champions League